Maharaja High School, in Sonepur, is one of the oldest high schools of Western Odisha. This was established in 1913 during the lordship of Raja Biramitra Singh Deo.

External links
MR High School
Maharaja High School, Subarnapur

High schools and secondary schools in Odisha
Education in Subarnapur district
Educational institutions established in 1913
1913 establishments in India